The Second Division Memorial is located in President's Park, between 17th Street Northwest and Constitution Avenue in Washington, DC, United States.

The Memorial commemorates those who died, while serving in the 2nd Infantry Division of the U. S. Army. The artist was James Earle Fraser. It was dedicated on July 18, 1936, by president Franklin D. Roosevelt.

It was rededicated in 1962, by Gen. Maxwell Taylor, with two wings added for the battle honors of World War II and the Korean War.

The flaming sword symbolizes the defense of Paris from the German advance.

See also
 List of public art in Washington, D.C., Ward 2

References

External links
Second Infantry Division Memorial, Hmdb

1936 sculptures
Artworks in the collection of the National Park Service
Bronze sculptures in Washington, D.C.
Military monuments and memorials in the United States
Monuments and memorials in Washington, D.C.
Outdoor sculptures in Washington, D.C.
Works by James Earle Fraser (sculptor)
President's Park